Linnea Ström (born 14 October 1996) is a Swedish professional golfer. She joined the U.S.-based LPGA Tour after graduating from the Symetra Tour as 2018 Rookie of the Year.

Amateur career
Ström became a member of the Swedish National Golf Team at age 13 and was part of the Swedish team winning the European Girls' Team Championship in 2012 and again in 2013. She was a member of the 2013 Junior Solheim Cup Team and the 2012 and 2014 European Junior Ryder Cup Team.

Ström and Marcus Kinhult, won gold in the mixed category at the 2014 Youth Olympic Games. She also won the 2014 Spanish International Ladies Amateur Championship, where she was runner-up the year after, as well as at the 2015 British Ladies Amateur Golf Championship. She qualified for the 2015 Women's British Open, her first major championship, where she did not made the cut.

Ström played college golf for the Arizona State Sun Devils at Arizona State University in Phoenix, Arizona, where she was the 2016 Pac-12 Conference Individual champion and Collegiate First Team All American 2016 and 2017. She led the Sun Devils to the program's eighth NCAA Division I National Championship in 2017.

In September 2016, Ström represented Sweden at the Espirito Santo Trophy in Mexico, were she finished as best Swedish competitor, tied 25th in a field of 163 players.

Professional career
Ranked ninth in the Women's World Amateur Golf Ranking, Ström quit ASU after 2.5 years in March 2018 to turn professional and play on the Symetra Tour, after a bout of food poisoning during the final stage of the LPGA Q-School saw her miss out on earning her LPGA card. She won her first professional tournament in September 2018, the Sioux Falls GreatLIFE Challenge, and won the 2018 Symetra Tour Rookie of the Year award. By finishing fifth on the 2018 Symetra Tour money list she earned membership of the LPGA Tour in October 2018.

On the 2019 LPGA Tour she made 11 cuts in 22 events and ended her rookie season 84th on the money list to retain her tour card. Her best finish was T5 at the Marathon Classic and she ranked 11th in average driving distance (271.52 yards), finishing sixth in the Louise Suggs Rolex Rookie of the Year standings. She earned starts at four majors and finished T26 at the 2019 ANA Inspiration. 

Ström started 2020 with a T4 at the ISPS Handa Vic Open, one stroke away from the playoff won by Park Hee-young, and finished third in the Australian Ladies Classic, a Ladies European Tour event. In August she finished T9 at the Walmart NW Arkansas Championship and finished the season 41st on the LPGA money list. 

In August 2021, Ström captained a team with Jenny Haglund and Agathe Sauzon that took a single-shot lead into the final day of the Aramco Team Series – Sotogrande. On the 54th-hole Stacy Lee Bregman holed a critical birdie that took her team to a playoff with Ström, and team captain Ashleigh Buhai won the title on the first extra hole.

In 2022, Ström divided her time between the Ladies European Tour and the Epson Tour. On the LET, she finished solo 3rd at the Magical Kenya Ladies Open after going into the final day with a two stroke lead. She was solo 2nd at the Madrid Ladies Open behind Ana Peláez. On the Epson Tour, she won the IOA Championship and was runner-up at the Twin Bridges Championship. She was the leading money winner to become Epson Tour Player of the Year and re-gain her fully exempt status on the LPGA Tour for the 2023 season.

Amateur wins
2012 Annika Invitational Europe, Swedish Junior Strokeplay Championship, Swedish Junior Matchplay Championship 
2013 Polo Golf Junior Classic
2014 Spanish International Ladies Amateur Championship, Youth Olympic Games (with Marcus Kinhult)
2016 Pac-12 Conference Individual champion
2017 NCAA Division I Women's Golf Championships

Professional wins

Epson Tour wins

Playoff record
Ladies European Tour playoff record (0–1)

Team appearances
Amateur
European Girls' Team Championship (representing Sweden): 2012 (winners), 2013 (winners)
Junior Ryder Cup (representing Europe): 2012, 2014
Junior Solheim Cup (representing Europe): 2013
Espirito Santo Trophy (representing Sweden): 2014, 2016
Vagliano Trophy (representing the Continent of Europe): 2015 (winners), 2017 (winners)
European Ladies' Team Championship (representing Sweden): 2014, 2015, 2016, 2017

References

External links

Swedish female golfers
Arizona State Sun Devils women's golfers
LPGA Tour golfers
Ladies European Tour golfers
Golfers at the 2014 Summer Youth Olympics
Youth Olympic gold medalists for Sweden
Sportspeople from Gothenburg
1996 births
Living people